Sericorema is a genus of flowering plants belonging to the family Amaranthaceae.

Its native range is Southern Tropical and Southern Africa.

Species
Species:

Sericorema remotiflora 
Sericorema sericea

References

Amaranthaceae
Amaranthaceae genera